Ockwells Park is a park, part of which is a local nature reserve, in Cox Green, Berkshire, England. The nature reserve is owned by the Royal Borough of Windsor and Maidenhead.

Geography and site
The park features sports pitches, a cafe and the nature reserve, which includes woodland, meadow, copses and a stream.

History

The park was originally part of the estate belonging to Ockwells Manor Estate.
The Park was opened to the public during the 1980s. In 1999 part of the site was declared as a local nature reserve by the Royal Borough of Windsor and Maidenhead.

In December 2012 and completed in February 2013, 1000 trees were planted to form an area called Jubilee Wood, when the council decided to participate in the Woodland Trust's Jubilee Wood Project.

The site was open to the public in April 2017 after having been cleared of equipment from the previous owners and a bridge to the existing park site being built.

Flora
The site has the following flora:

Trees

Populus tremula
Malus sylvestris
Acer campestre
Crataegus monogyna
Carpinus betulus
Tilia × europaea
Quercus robur

Plants

Rosa canina

References

Local Nature Reserves in Berkshire